Enclosed religious orders or cloistered clergy are religious orders whose members strictly separate themselves from the affairs of the external world.  In the Catholic Church, enclosure is regulated by the code of canon law, either the Latin code or the Oriental code, and also by the constitutions of the specific order. It is practised with a variety of customs according to the nature and charism of the community in question. This separation may involve physical barriers such as walls and grilles (that is, a literal cloister), with entry restricted for other people and certain areas exclusively permitted to the members of the convent. Outsiders may only temporarily enter this area under certain conditions (for example, if they are candidates for the order, doctors or craftsmen). The intended purpose for such enclosure is to prevent distraction from prayer and the religious life and to keep an atmosphere of silence.

Under certain circumstances, exceptions may be granted for enclosed men or women to leave the enclosure temporarily or permanently.

Enclosed religious orders of men include monks following the Rule of Saint Benedict, namely the Benedictine, the Cistercian, and the Trappist orders, but also monks of the Carthusians, Hieronymites, and some branches of Carmelites, along with members of the Monastic Family of Bethlehem, while enclosed religious orders of women include Canonesses Regular, nuns belonging to the Benedictine, Cistercian, Trappist and the Carthusian orders, along with nuns of the second order of each of the mendicant orders, including: the Poor Clares, the Colettine Poor Clares, the Capuchin Poor Clares, the Dominicans, Carmelites, Servites, Augustinians, Minims, together with the Conceptionist nuns, the Visitandine nuns, Ursuline nuns and the Monastic Family of Bethlehem.

Contemplative orders 
The English word monk most properly refers to men in monastic life, while the term friar more properly refers to mendicants active in the world (like Franciscans, Dominicans and Augustinians), though not all monasteries require strict enclosure. Benedictine monks, for instance, have often staffed parishes and been allowed to leave monastery confines.

Although the English word nun is often used to describe all Christian women who have joined religious institutes, strictly speaking, women are referred to as nuns only when they live in papal enclosure; otherwise, they are religious sisters. The distinctions between the Christian terms monk, nun, friar, Brother, and Sister are sometimes easily blurred because some orders (such as the Dominicans or Augustinians) include nuns who are enclosed, who are usually grouped as the Second Order of that movement, and religious sisters.

Exclaustration 
In the Roman Rite of the Catholic Church, once a man or woman has made solemn, perpetual religious vows, the release from these monastic vows has to be approved by the ecclesiastical authorities. Normally there is a transitional period, called exclaustration, in which the person looks to establish a new life and determine if this is what he or she is truly called to do. This usually lasts up to six years under the 1983 Code of Canon Law. After this period the appropriate authority, generally the Holy See, determines that the wish to leave this life is valid and grants the former monk or nun release from their vows.

Monastic life 
Contemplative orders prioritise worship and prayer over economic or outreach activity. They exist in the Roman Catholic, Anglican and Eastern Orthodox
traditions as well as in Buddhist settings.

See also 
 Anchorite
 Hermit
 Cenobitic monasticism

References

External links 
 What is a Cloistered Nun? – AN INTRODUCTION TO CONTEMPLATIVE LIFE
 New Advent Encyclopaedia on "Religious Life"
 New Advent Encyclopaedia III ff. on "Nuns, properly so called"
 

Christian asceticism
Christian orders
Christian monasticism
Catholic orders and societies by type